Gyan Dev Ahuja is an Indian politician from the Bharatiya Janata Party and a member of the Rajasthan Legislative Assembly representing the Ramgarh Vidhan Sabha constituency of Rajasthan. He hails from Sindhi Community.

On 24 December 2017, Ahuja gained controversy after he claimed that people who smuggle and slaughter cows would be killed.

On 30 July 2018, he praised cow vigilantes for lynching an alleged cow smuggler in Lalawandi village while also claiming that cow slaughter was a bigger crime than terrorism.

References

Living people
People from Jaipur district
Bharatiya Janata Party politicians from Rajasthan
Rajasthan MLAs 2013–2018
Year of birth missing (living people)